Mr. Meeble was an electronic rock band from Phoenix, Arizona, formed in late 2005 by Devin Fleenor and Michael Plaster. The band grew its fan base primarily via websites such as YouTube, and continued to self-release music and videos on its label, Absolute Motion. They were regarded for their visually elaborated live shows, combining video projections, RGB lasers and other custom-made visual devices to enhance the mix of electronics and live instrumentation. A writer for Wired described their sound as "coded into the musical matrix somewhere between Depeche Mode and Massive Attack". Another journalist wrote that "Mr. Meeble's sound falls somewhere between Radiohead and Stereolab". In their own biography, the band names Thom Yorke and Air as influences.

Touring
In the fall of 2011, Mr. Meeble set off on a tour of 11 European countries.  The tour was booked and organized by Devin Fleenor and included the following dates/venues:

 03/09/11: Berlin, Germany – Session Café
 06/09/11: Poznan, Poland – Blue Note
 08/09/11: Warsaw, Poland – Klub Fabryka Kotłów
 09/09/11: Wroclaw, Poland – Klub Muzyczny Liverpool
 10/09/11: Prague, Czech – Club Kaštan
 13/09/11: Cluj-Napoca, Romania – Flying Circus Pub
 15/09/11: Bucharest, Romania – The Silver Church Club
 17/09/11: Timișoara, Romania – Setup Club
 18/09/11: Novi Sad, Serbia – CK13
 19/09/11: Budapest, Hungary – Tündérgyár
 22/09/11: Vienna, Austria – B72
 24/09/11: Geneva, Switzerland – Le Cabinet
 25/09/11: Geneva, Switzerland – KAB | Usine
 01/10/11: Barcelona, Spain – Puerto Hurrako Sisters Bar
 04/10/11: Madrid, Spain – Sala Bar&Co
 07/10/11: Murcia, Spain – Sala Musik
 10/10/11: Porto, Portugal – Hard Club
 13/10/11: Frankfurt, Germany – Das Bett
 20/10/11: London, UK – The Dublin Castle

Discography

Albums
 Never Trust the Chinese (2008, CD & digital Absolute Motion (USA))
 Never Trust the Chinese (Limited) (2009, digital Absolute Motion (USA))

EPs
 Non Assault Message Medium Enjoyment Maxi Single (2007, CD & digital Absolute Motion (USA))
 Nostalgic for Now (2012, CD & digital Absolute Motion (USA))

Video/DVDs
 Smoke & Mirrors (2010, DVD Absolute Motion (USA))

Disbanding
As Devin Fleenor mentioned in a tweet, he suffered from bronchiectasis, a chronic disease that affects the lungs and worsens over time. On March 29, 2018, he passed due to complications from this disease. Mr. Meeble disbanded right after.

References

External links
 Official site

American electronic rock musical groups
American post-rock groups
Rock music groups from Arizona
Musical groups from Phoenix, Arizona
Musical groups established in 2005
Trip hop groups